Tyrell Nathaniel Warren (born 5 October 1998) is an English professional footballer who plays for Barrow, as a full back.

Career
Warren played youth football for Manchester United. He moved to Salford City in 2019, spending time on loan at Radcliffe and Boston United. After a permanent spell with Boston he moved to FC Halifax Town in August 2021, before signing for Barrow in June 2022.

Career statistics

References

1998 births
Living people
English footballers
Manchester United F.C. players
Salford City F.C. players
Radcliffe F.C. players
Boston United F.C. players
FC Halifax Town players
Forest Green Rovers F.C. players
Association football fullbacks
National League (English football) players
English Football League players